Ferrocerium (also known in Europe as Auermetall) is a synthetic pyrophoric alloy of mischmetal (cerium, lanthanum, neodymium, other trace lanthanides and some iron – about 95% lanthanides and 5% iron) hardened by blending in oxides of iron and/or magnesium. When struck with a harder material, the mixture produces hot sparks that can reach temperatures of  when rapidly oxidized by the process of striking the rod. Striking both scrapes fragments off, exposing them to the oxygen in the air, and easily ignites them by friction heat due to cerium's remarkably low ignition temperature of ~.

Its easy flammability gives ferrocerium many commercial applications, such as the ignition source for lighters, strikers for gas welding and cutting torches, deoxidization in metallurgy, and ferrocerium rods. Because of ferrocerium's ability to ignite in adverse conditions, rods of ferrocerium (also called ferro rods, spark rods, and flint-spark-lighters) are commonly used as an emergency fire lighting device in survival kits. The ferrocerium is referred to as a "flint" in this case despite being dissimilar to natural flint as both are used in conjunction for fire lighting, albeit with opposite mechanical operation.

Discovery 

Ferrocerium alloy was invented in 1903 by the Austrian chemist Carl Auer von Welsbach. It takes its name from its two primary components: iron (from ), and the rare-earth element cerium, which is the most prevalent of the lanthanides in the mixture. Except for the extra iron and magnesium oxides added to harden it, the mixture is approximately the combination found naturally in tailings from thorium mining, which Auer von Welsbach was investigating. The pyrophoric effect is dependent on the brittleness of the alloy and its low autoignition temperature.

Composition 

In Auer von Welsbach's first alloy, 30% iron (ferrum) was added to purified cerium, hence the name "ferro-cerium". Two subsequent Auermetalls were developed: the second also included lanthanum to produce brighter sparks, and the third added other heavy metals. 

A modern ferrocerium firesteel product is composed of an alloy of rare-earth metals called mischmetal, containing approximately 20.8% iron, 41.8% cerium, about 4.4% each of praseodymium, neodymium, and magnesium, plus 24.2% lanthanum. A variety of other components are added to modify the spark and processing characteristics. Most contemporary flints are hardened with iron oxide and magnesium oxide.

Uses 

Ferrocerium is used in fire lighting in conjunction with steel, similarly to natural flint-and-steel, though ferrocerium takes on the opposite role to the traditional system; instead of a natural flint rock striking tiny iron particles from a firesteel, a steel striker (which may be in the form of hardened steel wheel) strikes particles of ferrocerium off of the "flint". Carbon steel works better than most other materials, in much the same way natural flint and firesteel are used.

It is most commonly used for Bunsen burners, propane grills, and oxyacetylene welding torches.

About 700 tons were produced in 2000.

References

External links 

 

Ferroalloys
Firelighting using percussion